Meshali or Lesnoy is a village de facto in the Askeran Province of the self-proclaimed Republic of Artsakh, de jure in the Khojaly District of Azerbaijan. The village is located in the mountains to the west of the village of Patara.

History 
Memorial wrote about the forced exodus of the Azerbaijani inhabitants of the village, along with several other Azerbaijani villages around the area during the First Nagorno-Karabakh War. They emphasized the grave violence against Azerbaijani civilians in Meshali specifically.

References

External links 
 

Populated places in Khojaly District